Phi Tauri (φ Tauri) is a solitary, orange-hued star in the zodiac constellation of Taurus. It has an apparent visual magnitude of +4.96, which indicates the star is faintly visible to the naked eye. Based upon an annual parallax shift of 10.16 mas as seen from Earth, it is located roughly 321 light years distant from the Sun. At that distance, the visual magnitude of the star is diminished by an extinction factor of 0.27 due to interstellar dust.

This is an evolved, K-type giant star with a stellar classification of K1 III, currently (97% probability) on the red giant branch. It has an estimated 1.36 times the mass of the Sun and has expanded to 19 times the Sun's radius. At the age of roughly five billion years, it is radiating 131 times the Sun's luminosity from its inflated photosphere at an effective temperature of 4,479 K.

Phi Tauri has a magnitude 7.51 visual companion located at an angular separation of 48.80 arc seconds along a position angle of 258°, as of 2015. The pair form a yellow and blue double that is visible in small telescopes. A fainter, magnitude 12.27 companion lies at a separation of 118.10 arc seconds along a position angle of 25°, as of 2001.

Naming
With κ1, κ2, υ and χ, it composed the Arabic were the Arabs' Al Kalbain, the Two Dogs. According to the catalogue of stars in the Technical Memorandum 33-507 - A Reduced Star Catalog Containing 537 Named Stars, Al Kalbain were the title for five stars : this star (φ) as Alkalbain I, χ as Alkalbain II, κ1 as Alkalbain III, κ2 as Alkalbain IV and υ as Alkalbain V.

References

K-type giants
Double stars
Tauri, Phi
Taurus (constellation)
Durchmusterung objects
Tauri, 052
027382
020250
1348